Golshan or Gulshan may refer to:

Places

Bangladesh
 Gulshan Thana, a neighbourhood in Dhaka, Bangladesh

Iran
 Gulshan or Golshan, former name of Tabas, South Khorasan Province, Iran
 Golshan, alternate name of Gavmishabad, Ahvaz, Khuzestan Province, Iran
 Golshan, another name for Afif-Abad Garden, in Shiraz, Iran
 Golshan Gas Field, Iran
 Golshan, Gilan, a village in Bandar-e Anzali County, Gilan Province, Iran
 Golshan, Hormozgan, a village in Bandar Lengeh County, Hormozgan Province, Iran
 Golshan, Anar, a village in Anar County, Kerman Province, Iran
 Golshan, Kohgiluyeh and Boyer-Ahmad, a village in Boyer-Ahmad County, Kohgiluyeh and Boyer-Ahmad Province, Iran
 Golshan, Kurdistan
 Golshan, Nishapur, a village in Nishapur County, Razavi Khorasan Province, Iran
 Golshan, Miyan Jolgeh, a village in Nishapur County, Razavi Khorasan Province, Iran
 Golshan Rural District, in South Khorasan Province, Iran
 Golshan, alternate name of Nahr-e Sen, Khuzestan Province, Iran

Pakistan
 Gulshan-e-Iqbal Town or Gulshan Town, a town in Karachi, Sindh, Pakistan
 Gulshan-e-Iqbal or Gulshan-e-Iqbal II, two neighborhoods of Gulshan-e-Iqbal Town in Karachi, Sindh, Pakistan
 Gulshan-e-Hadeed, a neighborhood of Bin Qasim Town in Karach, Sindh, Pakistan
 Gulshan-e-Bahar, a neighborhood of New Karachi Town in Karachi, Sindh, Pakistan
 Gulshan-e-Farooq, a neighborhood of New Karachi Town in Karachi, Sindh, Pakistan
 Gulshan-e-Ghazi, a neighborhood of Baldia Town in Karachi, Sindh, Pakistan
 Gulshan-e-Maymar, a neighborhood of Gadap Town in Karachi, Sindh, Pakistan
 Gulshan-e-Mehran, a neighborhood of Korangi Town in Karachi, Sindh, Pakistan
 Gulshan-e-Saeed, a neighborhood of New Karachi Town in Karachi, Sindh, Pakistan
 Gulshan-e-Sheraz, a neighborhood of New Karachi Town in Karachi, Sindh, Pakistan

People
 Paramjit Kaur Gulshan (born 1949), Indian politician
 Gulshan Ajmani, Indian politician
 Gulshan Kumar Mehta (1937–2009), Indian lyricist
 Gulshan Devaiah (born 1978), Indian actor
 Gulshan Grover (born 1955), Indian film actor
 Gulshan Hossain (born 1962), Bangladeshi artist
 Gulshan Kumar (1951–1997), Indian businessperson, founder T-Series
 Gulshan Nanda (1929–1984), Indian novelist and screenwriter
 Gulshan Rai (1924–2004), Indian film producer and distributor

Other uses
 Gulshan-i Raz, collection of 14th century poems
 Gulshan-i Raz-i Jadid, poem by Sir Muhammad Iqbal
 Chahar Gulshan ("Four Gulshans"), 18th century Persian language book about the history of India containing four sections, each called a gulshan

See also 
 Gülşen, a given name
 Gulistan (disambiguation)